Major Aichatou Ousmane Issaka, deputy director of social work at the military hospital of Niamey, is one of the first military women in Niger.  In 2016 she received the United Nations Military Gender Advocate of the Year Award for her service in Gao, Mali with the United Nations peacekeeping force, MINUSMA, during 2014–2015.  She served as a captain in the civilian-military cooperation cell, training fellow officers and reaching out to local women, in accordance with principles of United Nations Security Council Resolution 1325 (2000) to increase participation of women and to integrate gender perspectives in peacekeeping efforts. Issaka also accompanied otherwise all-male patrols, making them more accessible to women and children. She was the first recipient of this award.

On March 29, 2017, Issaka received the International Women of Courage Award for her peacekeeping contributions in Niger and in Mali, from First Lady of the United States Melania Trump and Under-Secretary of State for Political Affairs Thomas A. Shannon.

References

Nigerien women
Peacekeeping
Year of birth missing (living people)
Living people
Place of birth missing (living people)
Female military personnel
Courage awards
Nigerien military personnel
Recipients of the International Women of Courage Award